Henwick is a suburb of Worcester, England. It is located to the west of the River Severn and to the north of St. John's. Henwick is often affected by flooding of the Severn particularly along parts of the Hylton Road which runs next to the river. The offices of the Worcester Journal and Worcester News newspapers, and the BBC Hereford and Worcester studios are all located next to the Hylton Road in Henwick. The University of Worcester's primary campus is also in Henwick.

References

Geography of Worcester, England